Miguel Ángel Tejeda Ramírez (born September 21, 1994, in Colima City, Colima) is a Mexican footballer.

References

External links
 

1994 births
Living people
Association football goalkeepers
Loros UdeC footballers
Ascenso MX players
Liga Premier de México players
Footballers from Colima
People from Colima City
Mexican footballers